Snap parliamentary elections were held in Kyrgyzstan on 28 November 2021. They followed the annulment of the results of the October 2020 elections and the subsequent protests against the election's conduct. Seven parties passed the 5% threshold and will take up seats in the parliament. Turnout hit a record low at less than 35%.

Background 
Following the large-scale 2020 Kyrgyz protests which resulted in the annulment of the October parliamentary election results, as well as the resignation of President Sooronbay Jeenbekov, Central Electoral Commission (CEC) head Nurjan Shyldabekova on 16 October 2020 announced that repeat elections could be held on 20 December. At a CEC meeting on 21 October, the elections were scheduled for the aforementioned date in December. However, just a day later on 22 October, the Supreme Council voted on a bill postponing the snap parliamentary elections and determining that they would be held no later than 1 June 2021, after new amendments to the Constitution would be adopted.

On 10 January 2021, the presidential and government system referendum elections were held concurrently. As a result, Sadyr Japarov was elected as president with majority of voters approving his vision of a constitutional reform that called for a return of the country's presidential system. After Japarov assumed office, during an interview with Kazakh-based Kazinform news agency, he announced that the parliamentary elections would not be held in June, but in autumn instead.

During the course of political changes, Kyrgyzstan suffered a democratic backslide with a drop in its Freedom House world ranking to the "Not Free" category. In addition, several activists and academicians who criticised the authorities were charged with treason after being accused of calling for a violent seizure of power.

A new draft of the Constitution was unveiled in February 2021, which resulted in more calls for a referendum that was held in April 2021 and approved by a majority of voters. After coming to force on 5 May 2021, the seats in the Supreme Council were reduced from 120 to 90 along with MPs' powers, and a political advisory body People's Kurultai was formed. The head of state (President) was granted more executive authority, as well as the power to appoint almost all judges and heads of law enforcement agencies. New amendments to the Criminal Code, which were proposed by the Ministry of the Interior, were condemned by Human Rights Watch, warning that they would "endanger freedom of association and speech".

Electoral system
Out of the 90 seats in the Supreme Council 54 will be elected by proportional representation in a single nationwide constituency, and 36 in single-seat districts. To win seats, parties must pass a national electoral threshold of 5% of the votes cast (down from 7% in the October 2020 elections), and receive at least 0.5% of the vote in each of the seven regions. The lists are open, with voters able to cast a single preferential vote. No one party is allowed to be given more than half of the proportional seats. Party lists are required to have at least 30% of the candidates from each gender, and every fourth candidate had to be of a different gender. Each list is also required to have at least 15% of the candidates being from ethnic minorities and 15% of under 35 years old, as well as at least two candidates with disabilities.

In addition, parliament abolished the use of Form No. 2, which allowed Kyrgyz voters to register to cast their ballots outside of their official home districts. The system was intended to allow migrant workers to vote where they worked, but after record numbers of this type of ballot were cast in the previous, annulled election, it was thought that the forms were abused to manipulate vote totals in the different regions.

Parties admitted to the elections
A total of 21 parties were admitted to the elections. The Birimdik and Mekenim Kyrgyzstan parties did not participate, with former members joining other party lists.

Opinion polls

Results

Reactions 
After the announcement of preliminary results of the vote, opposition parties denounced the election at a protest held in Bishkek on 29 November 2021, citing alleged electoral fraud that occurred during the counting as a blackout at the tabulation screen had shown several parties falling below the 5% electoral threshold. Omurbek Tekebayev, leader of the Ata Meken Socialist Party, called for the results to be annulled once again, just as in the previous parliamentary election. In response to the allegations, CEC chairwoman Nurjan Shyldabekova asserted that the malfunction had occurred only at the monitor display and not within the counting process, which would have affected the results.

On 1 December 2021, Omurbek Tekebayev was attacked by unknown persons at a restaurant. In response, Tekebayev linked the incident to his activities, calling it "political terror".

References

2021 elections in Asia
Parliamentary election
2021
November 2021 events in Asia